BRG Sports makes sports equipment and clothing under the Riddell brand. Its parent company is Fenway Partners.

Brands

Current
Riddell

Former
Bell Sports and Giro are now owned by Vista Outdoor.  
Easton Diamond (baseball and softball) is now owned by Rawlings.
Easton Hockey is now owned by Peak Achievement Athletics, parent of Bauer Hockey.
Easton Cycling is now owned by Fox Factory.

See also

Easton Archery, manufacturer of archery equipment and original owner of the Easton brands

References

Sporting goods manufacturers
Sporting goods manufacturers of the United States